An ogre is a large, hideous monster of mythology, folklore and fiction.

Ogre may also refer to:

Comics and manga 
 Ogre (comics)
 Ogre (Marvel Comics), a Marvel Comics character, first appearing in X-Men in 1967
 Ogre (DC Comics), a DC Comics genetically-engineered character, first appearing in Batman in 1996
 O.G.R.E. (comics), acronym used by two fictional villain organizations in DC Comics' Aquaman
 Ogre (Rave Master), an antagonist in the Japanese manga/anime series

Gaming

Game series 
Ogre Battle, a series of tactical role-playing video games

Game titles 
Ogre (board game), a tabletop wargame
 Ogre (2017 video game), a computer game in development by Auroch Digital
 Ogre (video game), a 1986 computer game released by Origin Systems

Game elements 
 Ogre (Dungeons & Dragons), a fictional monster found in the Dungeons & Dragons roleplaying game
 Ogre (Warhammer), a fictional race found in Warhammer Fantasy
 Ogre (Tekken), a character in the fighting game Tekken
 Ogre, a type of Darkspawn creature in the Dragon Age media franchise

Game engines 
 OGRE, Object-Oriented Graphics Rendering Engine, a 3D graphics engine
 Open Gaming Resource Engine, a Doom source port by TeamTNT

Films and television 
 The Ogre, nickname of Frederick Palowakski, a character from the 1984 movie Revenge of the Nerds and sequels
 The Ogre (1989 film), a 1989 Italian horror film
 The Ogre (1996 film), a 1996 French drama
 Ogre (2008 film), a 2008 horror film directed by Steven R. Monroe
 Les Ogres, a 2015 French film

Music 
 Nivek Ogre (b. 1962), stage name of performer Kevin Ogilvie, singer of the band Skinny Puppy
 ohGr, the intentionally misspelled name of Nivek Ogre's band after the demise of Skinny Puppy
 Ogre (band), an America heavy metal band
 Les Ogres de Barback, French musical group also known as Les Ogres

Places 
 Ogre District, Latvia
 Ogre, Latvia, principal town of the Ogre District
 Ogre River, river in Latvia
 The Ogre, nickname for Baintha Brakk, a mountain in the Karakoram range of the Himalaya in Pakistan

Other 
 Ogre, Ogre, fifth book of the Xanth series by Piers Anthony

See also 
 Ochre (disambiguation)
 Oger (disambiguation)
 The Ogre (disambiguation)
 Wikipedia:WikiOgre

ar:غول (توضيح)